Argyarctia sericeipennis is a moth of the family Erebidae. It was described by Rothschild in 1933. It is found in China (Yunnan).

References

 , 2010: Tiger-moths of Eurasia (Lepidoptera, Arctiidae) (Nyctemerini by ). Neue Entomologische Nachrichten 65: 1–106, Marktleuthen.
 , 2007: Review of the genus Argyarctia Kôda (Lepidoptera, Arctiidae). Euroasian Entomological Journal 6 (1): 81–84.
 , 1994: A study of the genus Argyarctia (Lepidoptera, Arctiidae). Sinozoologia 11: 97–99, Beijing (in Chinese).
 , 1933: New species and subspecies of Arctiinae. The Annals and Magazine of Natural History (series 10) 11: 167–194, London.

Moths described in 1933
Moths of Asia
Endemic fauna of Yunnan
Spilosomina